Brian Keith Davis (born June 21, 1970) is an American former college and professional basketball player. A 6'7" guard-forward, Davis played both football and basketball at Bladensburg High School. He then played four years of basketball at Duke University, appearing in 141 career games, and was a member of the back-to-back national championship teams of 1991 and 1992.

After graduation, Davis played in the French league with Élan Béarnais Pau-Orthez during the 1992–93 season alongside seven-foot-seven Gheorghe Muresan, and then returned to the NBA for the 1993–94 season with the Minnesota Timberwolves, where he played alongside Duke teammate Christian Laettner. Davis played in 68 NBA games, averaged 5.5 minutes per game, and scored a total of 131 career points (1.9 per game).

He maintains a close friendship with Laettner, and they partnered on a $2 million donation to Duke's men's basketball program to endow an athletic scholarship and support construction of an athletics center and practice facility. They have also pursued several business ventures together, including real estate development in Durham, a Major League Soccer team, and an unsuccessful attempt to purchase the Memphis Grizzlies. Some legal problems have also occurred.

References

1970 births
Living people
African-American basketball players
Aliağa Petkim basketball players
American expatriate basketball people in France
American expatriate basketball people in Turkey
American men's basketball players
American soccer chairmen and investors
Basketball players at the 1995 Pan American Games
Basketball players from New Jersey
Duke Blue Devils men's basketball players
Élan Béarnais players
Minnesota Timberwolves players
Pan American Games medalists in basketball
Pan American Games silver medalists for the United States
Phoenix Suns draft picks
Pittsburgh Piranhas players
Small forwards
Sportspeople from Atlantic City, New Jersey
Medalists at the 1995 Pan American Games
21st-century African-American sportspeople
20th-century African-American sportspeople